Home for Christmas may refer to:

Music

Albums
 Home for Christmas (BarlowGirl album), a 2008 album by American Christian rock band BarlowGirl
 Home for Christmas (Debby Boone album), a 1989 album by American pop singer Debby Boone
 Home for Christmas (Susan Boyle album), a 2013 album by Scottish operatic pop singer Susan Boyle
 Home for Christmas (George Canyon album), a 2005 album by Canadian country music singer George Canyon
 Home for Christmas (Sheryl Crow album). a 2008 album by American pop rock singer Sheryl Crow
 Home for Christmas (Amy Grant album), 1992 album by Christian and pop music singer Amy Grant
 Home for Christmas (Hall & Oates album), a 2006 album by American pop rock duo Daryl Hall & John Oates
 Home for Christmas (Military Wives album), a 2016 album by the British choir Military Wives
 Home for Christmas (NSYNC album), a 1998 album by American boy band NSYNC
 Home for Christmas (Dolly Parton album), a 1990 album by American country singer-songwriter Dolly Parton
 Home for Christmas (John Schneider and Tom Wopat album), a 2014 album by duet album by American country singers John Schneider and Tom Wopat
 Home for Christmas (Luther Vandross album), a 2001 a repackaging of American R&B singer Luther Vandross's 1995 album This Is Christmas
 Home for Christmas (Celtic Woman album), a 2012 album by Irish new age/pop musical ensemble Celtic Woman

Songs
 "Home for Christmas" (Danity Kane song), a 2006 single by American girl group Danity Kane
 "Home for Christmas", a 1993 song by English art pop singer Kate Bush that is the b-side on both the "Rubberband Girl" and "Moments of Pleasure" singles

Film & TV 
 Home for Christmas (1975 film), a Finnish film
 Little Miss Millions, a 1993 film starring Jennifer Love Hewitt, also known as Home for Christmas
 Home for Christmas (2010 film), a Norwegian film
Home for Christmas (TV series), a 2019 Norwegian TV series

See also
 "Driving Home for Christmas"
 "I'll Be Home for Christmas"
 I'll Be Home for Christmas (1998 film)
 "I Won't Be Home for Christmas"